The Curse of Blondie is the eighth studio album from the American rock band Blondie. It was released in October 2003, and peaked at #36 in the UK.

Background and recording 

Towards the end of 2002, Beyond Music abruptly closed down following a dispute, and Blondie signed with Sony Music. The Curse of Blondie had the working title Phasm 8, which was also the name of the tour they were doing before the release. Craig Leon, who had also produced their previous hit album No Exit, started work on the album, but it was four years in the making as the only demo tapes of the album had disappeared from luggage at a UK airport, and so had to be re-recorded. Leon ultimately did not produce the album, which was largely helmed by Steve Thompson with Jeff Bova producing one track, "Good Boys".

The album incorporates a rock-inspired arrangement style more reminiscent of Blondie's earliest recordings. Rhythms played include mostly rock ("Golden Rod, "Rules for Living", "End to End", "Hello Joe", "Last One in the World", "Diamond Bridge") and then dance-pop ("Good Boys", "Undone", "The Tingler"). Other incursions are Japanese traditional music ("Magic (Asadoya Yunta)"), reggae ("Background Melody (The Only One)"), jazz ("Desire Brings Me Back", "Songs of Love (For Richard)") and rap ("Shakedown"). The track "Hello Joe" is an homage to Joey Ramone, and includes a reference to "Blitzkrieg Bop" ("hey ho, ¡hola Joe!" instead of "hey ho, let's go!").

Release

The album was released with various bonus tracks in some territories, while the US edition included the music video for the single "Good Boys". The album was also re-released in 2004 in US on DualDisc format. The CD side contained the normal album, while the DVD side included:
 Entire album in 5.1 Surround Sound and Stereo
 "Good Boys" music video
 Photo gallery
 ROM content

The album was also released in Indonesia as a Cassette Tape.

The only single from the album was "Good Boys", which peaked at #12 in the UK and was a dance hit in the USA. Promo singles of "Undone" were sent to radio, but no official release was made.

Reception

The Curse of Blondie gained mixed reviews, some critics called it a good or very good album, while others said it was a downfall for the band. Critics highlighted the band's songwriting and soundcrafting ("a pop masterclass", Uncut), as well as the maturity in which they experiment with different genres as "they never pretend they’re something they’re not, such as young" (Blender). Following its release in 2003, Blondie embarked into a two years long international world tour, playing more than 160 gigs in Europe, Asia, the three Americas and Oceania. TV performances included The Today Show, The Late Show with David Letterman, The Late Late Show with Craig Kilborn, Good Day Live, Top of the Pops, and specials "Women Rock!" and "VH1 Divas Live". Blondie also performed at Live by Request and subsequently released a CD/DVD of the performance.

Despite the relative success of the "Good Boys" single, the album performed poorly, peaking at #36 in the UK and #160 in the United States. As of August 9, 2005 it has sold 34,000 copies in United States.

Track listing

Personnel 

Blondie
Debbie Harry – vocals
Chris Stein – guitar
Jimmy Destri – keyboards
Clem Burke – drums

Additional musicians
Jimi K. Bones
Paul Carbonara
Gretchen Langheld
Frank Pagaro
Leigh Foxx
James Mazlen
Kyle Whelan - soprano saxophone (Songs of Love)

Production and design

Steve Thompson – producer (except "Good Boys"), mixing (except "Magic (Asadoya Yunta)")
Jeff Bova – producer ("Good Boys")
Kevin Griffin – additional production ("Good Boys")
Allen Kovac – executive producer
Craig Leon – producer (basic tracks, except "Good Boys", "Undone" and "Background Melody (The Only One)")
James Michael – additional production (basic tracks, except "Good Boys", "Undone" and "Background Melody (The Only One)")
Randy Nicklaus – additional production (basic tracks, except "Good Boys", "Undone" and "Background Melody (The Only One)")
Jinsoo Kim – mixing ("Magic (Asadoya Yunta)")
Christina Ingram – mixing ("Magic (Asadoya Yunta)")
John Goodmanson – engineer, mixing
Paul Logus – engineer
Danni Bernini – engineer
Roy Hendrickson – engineer
Tom Weir – engineer
Ross Petersen – assistant engineer
Sean Spuehler – programming
Howie Beno – programming
James Mazlen – programming
George Marino – mastering
Giorgio Moroder – additional production and remix ("Good Boys" (Giorgio Moroder Single Mix))
Tommy Schobel – programming ("Good Boys (Giorgio Moroder Single Mix)")
Patrick Shevelin – programming ("Good Boys (Giorgio Moroder Single Mix)")
Steve Shepherd – remix engineer ("Good Boys (Giorgio Moroder Single Mix)")
Robert Roth – art direction, photography
Kitty Boots – stylist
Marla Belt – make-up

Charts

References

External links

Blondie (band) albums
2003 albums
Sanctuary Records albums